The Irish League in season 1924–25 comprised 12 teams, and Glentoran won the championship.

League standings

Results

References
Northern Ireland - List of final tables (RSSSF)

NIFL Premiership seasons
North
Football
Football
1924–25 in Northern Ireland association football